Oken Amakcham is an Indian film director, music director and actor who works in Manipuri films. He started his career in theatre and performing arts. He is a recipient of the National Film Award for Best Feature Film in Manipuri for the movie Mayophygee Macha at the 42nd National Film Awards. In 2002, he directed Lammei which marked the beginning of a digital era in Manipuri cinema. He took the role of music director in many of his movies. Cheina, Tellanga Mamei, Nungshithel are some of his notable films. He had been a jury member of 58th National Film Awards.

His movie Nungshithel (English: Abode of Love) was aired on Doordarshan Kendra Imphal as a four-episode teleplay. It was adapted from Arambam Samarendra's theatrical play of the same tite.

Career
Amakcham embarked on a journey into the world of performing arts, right after his graduation in 1981 from Dhanamanjuri College, Imphal. In 1981, he joined theatre and received guidance from renowned theatre personalities like G.C. Tongbra, Birjit Ngangomba, Kangabam Birbabu, Sanakhya Ibotombi and Heisnam Kanhailal. Driven by his passionate love for music, he admitted himself into the Government Music College, Manipur. In addition to this, he learned Hindustani Shastriya Sangeet from his gurus Laishram Ibopishak and Sanasam Ibopishak. He completed Visharad from Bhatkhande Sangeet Vidyapeeth, Lucknow.

His career in movies started with Sanakhya Ibotombi's 1986 film Iche Sakhi, where he got a chance to act in a role.  Amakcham's first celluloid film as a director is Khonthang, a 1992 movie. Before this, he had directed video films Urit Naapangbee and Laidhi Lubaak, produced by Thoungamba and Thouyangba for P.K. Films. His movie Mayophygee Macha was released in 1994 and stars Makhonmani Mongsaba and R.S. Joycee in the lead roles. He directed two more celluloid movies Aroiba Bidai and Cheina. His 2002 directorial venture Lammei is the first Manipuri video film to have a commercial screening at a theatre. It was shot by a digital camera. The movie also marked the beginning of a digital era in Manipuri cinema. Tellanga Mamei and Thajabagee Wangmada were among the movies screened at the First Festival of Manipuri Cinema 2007 organised by Film Forum Manipur. His association with Dashu Films are marked by films Cheina, Thajabagee Wangmada, Nangtana Helli and Tellanga Mamei.

He has given music direction for many of his feature films. The non-feature films made by Amakcham were mostly biographical documentations of well-known theatre personalities like Heisnam Kanhailal and Ratan Thiyam. In 2019, he directed a non-feature film Raseswari Pala. As of 2021, his movie Lammei was among the feature films screened in the inaugural week of the Golden Jubilee Celebration of Manipuri Cinema (1972-2022), organised from 9–18 April 2021 at MSFDS Imphal.

Accolades
Oken Amakcham's Khonthang was selected for Indian Panorama of the International Film Festival of India (IFFI), New Delhi in 1993. It was invited to Singapore International Film Festival 1994 and Festival of SPARROW, Mumbai, 2008. His 1994 movie Mayophygee Macha won the National Film Award for Best Feature Film in Manipuri at the 42nd National Film Awards held in 1995. It was scripted by M. K. Binodini Devi.

Amakcham's movie Aroiba Bidai was awarded the Best Feature Film award at the 4th Manipur State Film Awards 1999. His film Cheina won the Best Feature Film and Best Director awards at the 6th Manipur State Film Awards 2006. He won the Best Music Director award for his work in the movie Mamlasanu Taibangpal at the 11th Manipur State Film Awards 2018.

Filmography

Feature films

Non-feature films
Oken Amakcham has directed non-feature films as well. His non-feature The Theatre Incarnate is a biographical film on Heisnam Kanhailal. In 2007, he made Ratan Thiyam: The Man of Theatre and was selected for Indian Panorama of International Film Festival of India (IFFI), 2008 and 11th Mumbai International Film Festival 2008.

 The Theatre Incarnate (2005)
 Ratan Thiyam: The Man of Theatre (2007)
 T. Nobokumar: The Man of Folk Theatre
 Panthou
 Tinthrok (2017)
 Raseswari Pala (2019)

References

External links
 

Living people
Film directors from Manipur
Indian film directors
Meitei people
People from Imphal East district
Male actors from Manipur
1962 births